Britt Johansen is a Norwegian handball player. She played 156 matches for the Norway women's national handball team from 1978 to 1985.  She participated at the 1982 World Women's Handball Championship, where the Norwegian team placed seventh.

References

External links

Year of birth missing (living people)
Living people
Norwegian female handball players
20th-century Norwegian women